Hydrabad was an iron cargo and passenger sailing ship, built in Scotland and launched in 1865. She was owned by several successive companies, and served until being wrecked off the coast of New Zealand in 1878. There were attempts to salvage her, but they all failed, and the wreck was left to deteriorate on the shoreline.

Construction and early years
She was built by Robert Duncan & Company, of Port Glasgow, Scotland and launched on 14 May 1865. She was completed in August 1865, and initially owned by the Bombay Iron Ship Company, of Bombay. She was later acquired by Stephens and Sons, of London. Hydrabad was a full-rigged ship with three masts, built of iron. She had two holds, and an ornately carved figurehead of a Hindu warrior. Her accommodation was lavishly furnished.

Wreck

Hydrabad was bound from Lyttelton to Adelaide, carrying broad gauge rolling stock which had been sold by the Canterbury Provincial Railways to the South Australian government. While making the voyage she became caught in a severe storm on 24 June 1878. Her captain, a man named Holmwood, ran the ship aground on Waitarere Beach five kilometres south of the mouth of the Manawatu River in the North Island, to increase the passengers' and crew's chances of survival. There were no deaths in the wreck. Two attempts were made to refloat the vessel, the first in November 1878, and another on 7 January 1879. During the latter attempt, the steamer SS Glenelg managed to tow Hydrabad off the beach, but she then began to rapidly take on water. The attempt was abandoned and Hydrabad was left to drift up the beach, preparatory to her cargo being unloaded and taken to Foxton. Eventually a fire broke out, buckling her hull planks, and the wreck was abandoned. She had been insured for £15,000 and her cargo for £24,500.

The remains of Hydrabad were washed further and further up the beach by later storms, and today the wreck lies well above the high-water mark. It is periodically uncovered and recovered by shifting sands. The nearby community of Waitarere commissioned a survey of the Hydrabad from the Maritime Archaeological Association of New Zealand, to investigate the rate of decay of the wreck, and the possibility of creating a memorial using some or all of the remains.

Notes

References

1865 ships
Sailing ships
Ships built on the River Clyde
Maritime incidents in June 1878
Shipwrecks of New Zealand
History of Manawatū-Whanganui
Heritage New Zealand Category 2 historic places in Manawatū-Whanganui
1865 in Scotland
1878 in New Zealand
1878 disasters in New Zealand